Gustaf Dahlman (born 3 January 1997) is a Swedish swimmer. He competed in the men's 200 metre freestyle event at the 2018 FINA World Swimming Championships (25 m), in Hangzhou, China.

References

External links
 

1997 births
Living people
Swedish male freestyle swimmers
Place of birth missing (living people)
Swimmers at the 2015 European Games
European Games competitors for Sweden